Mir Mohammad Asim Kurd Gello is a Pakistani politician who was a Member of the Provincial Assembly of Balochistan, from May 2013 to May 2018.

Early life and education
He was born on 29 December 1957 in Quetta.

He has received a degree in Bachelor of Arts from the University of Balochistan.

Political career

He was elected to the Provincial Assembly of Balochistan from Constituency PB-30 Kachhi-I in 2002 Pakistani general election.

He was re-elected to the Provincial Assembly of Balochistan as a candidate of Pakistan Muslim League (Q) from Constituency PB-30 Bolan-I in 2008 Pakistani general election.

He was re-elected to the Provincial Assembly of Balochistan as an independent candidate from Constituency PB-30 Bolan-I in 2013 Pakistani general election. He joined Pakistan Muslim League (N) in May 2013.

References

Living people
Balochistan MPAs 2013–2018
1957 births
Pakistan Muslim League (N) politicians